This list comprises all players who participated in at least one league match for Rochester Thunder from the team's first season in the USL Premier Development League in 2009 until their last in 2010. Players who were on the roster but never played a first team game are not listed; players who appeared for the team in other competitions (US Open Cup, etc.) but never actually made a USL appearance are noted at the bottom of the page where appropriate.

A
  Chris Andre
  Samuel Asante

B
  Miguel Bonilla
  Teal Bunbury
  Jordan Burt

C
  Juan Chang
  Wesley Costa

D
  Muharem Dedic
  Travis Dehne
  Gustavo Dias

E
  Alex Evert

F
  Per Engebreth Faerden
  Christian Fernandes
  Ryan Franz

G
  Paul Grandstrand

H
  T. J. Haag
  Ross Hamilton
  Mark Heath-Preston
  Justin Hoskins

J
  Finn Jor

K
  Jordan Kadlec
  Jake Kessler

L
  Drew Lukas

M
  Santiago Mejia
  Naoki Mihara
  Luis Mojica
  Paul Monson
  Paul Moran
  Tyler Moriarty
  Juan Mundo

N
  Sebastian Narvaez

O
  Garrett O'Brien
  Francis Otira

P
  Brian Pederson
  Elliott Purdom

R
  Brian Reddish

S
  Ryan Sappington
  Ben Sippola
  Chris Sutton

T
  Kentaro Takada

W
  Hezekiah Weiss
  Bakari Williams

Z
  John Zietlow

Sources

 2010 Rochester Thunder stats
 2009 Rochester Thunder stats

References

Rochester Thunder
 
Association football player non-biographical articles